Apollo Glacier is a glacier,  long, flowing northeast and joining the lower part of Aphrodite Glacier  from the east coast of the Antarctic Peninsula.

History
The lower part of this glacier was first plotted by W.L.G. Joerg, from aerial photographs taken by Sir Hubert Wilkins in December 1928 and by Lincoln Ellsworth in November 1935. The glacier was subsequently photographed by the Ronne Antarctic Research Expedition in December 1947 (trimetrogon air photography) and roughly surveyed by the Falkland Islands Dependencies Survey in November 1960. It was named by the UK Antarctic Place-Names Committee after Apollo, the god of manly youth and beauty in Greek mythology.

See also
 List of glaciers in the Antarctic
 Glaciology

References 

Glaciers of Bowman Coast